"The Sleepers" is a poem by Walt Whitman. The poem was first published in the first edition of Leaves of Grass (1855), but was re-titled and heavily revised several times throughout Whitman's life.

Background 

The American poet Walt Whitman first published the poetry anthology Leaves of Grass in 1855. He continued to expand, revise, and rewrite poems in the collection until his death in 1892. The Academy of American Poets deemed the collection "possibly the greatest book of American poetry ever written." According to the poet J. D. McClatchy, "No one has been able to adequately describe how Walter Whitman came to write his book."

Writing and publication 
Whitman drafted "The Sleepers" in his notebook. The poem is one of the first five written works in Leaves of Grass; others included "Song of Myself", "I Sing the Body Electric". It was one of  twelve poems in the first edition of Leaves of Grass. Whitman revised the poem heavily; by the last edition of Leaves of Grass, the poem was changed from its original form to an extent that was unmatched by any other of Whitman's poems. The poem was untitled before 1855, taking the name "I wander all night" from the first line. It took the title "Night Poem" in 1856, "Sleep-Chasings" in 1860, and adopted the title "The Sleepers" in 1871, which it retained.

Content 
The poem is a dream vision; the first line reads "I wander all night in my vision". At the beginning of the poem, the narrator is described as "Wandering and confused, lost to myself, ill-assorted, contradictory". In the dream, they travel to various places, visiting people as they are asleep. The poet visits children first, who are described as being still and breathing quietly; French considers them paralyzed, comatose, or dead. Next, they come across various people who are suffering:

This world is a hellish one, but the narrator soon moves on, focusing on loving groups sleeping before returning to miserable people, such as prisoners and murderers. However, the poem quickly shifts to a more hopeful note:

French cites this as a turning point. Shortly before this moment, the narrator feels sympathetic for the suffering of various humans, and he starts to find peace and view the world from a happier light. French suggests that Whitman is making a connection directly between sympathy and truth. After this moment, once "distressed" and "confused" poet becomes excited, happy, and confident. Yet even this happiness is not complete, as the poet remembers miserable people, such as "the exile, the criminal that stood in the box/... the wasted or feeble person". After briefly dwelling on this, the poem has a portion from the point of view of the narrator's lover. In the subsequent sections, the narrator sees death and destruction (in the form of a drowning swimmer, a shipwreck, George Washington's troops being killed at the Battle of Brooklyn) and beauty (as Washington bidding his troops goodbye and a beautiful Native American woman who visits the poet's mother). French considers the native woman to be "at least ideally human" and she is the poem's penultimate section. When she departs, the poem ends in joy, as the narrator sees a vision of a world in "perfect order". The poem ends on a happy note as the narrator views people in better health:
The call of the slave is one with the master's call, and the master salutes the slave, 
The felon steps forth from the prison, the insane becomes sane, the suffering of sick persons   
    is reliev'd, 
The sweatings and fevers stop, the throat that was unsound is sound, the lungs of 
    the consumptive are resumed, the poor distress'd head is free, 
The joints of the rheumatic move as smoothly as ever, and smoother than ever, 
Stiflings and passages open, the paralyzed become supple, 
The swell'd and convuls'd and congested awake to themselves in condition, They pass the invigoration of the night and the chemistry of the night, and awake.

Reception 
The poem has gained a reputation as an obscure work. In 1902 John Burroughs said that "The Sleepers" was one of only a few Whitman poems he did not understand. The scholar Jerome Loving deemed "The Sleepers" "the most famous dream in American literature". The Cambridge Introduction to Walt Whitman listed "The Sleepers" as one of Whitman's most famous poems. It goes on to describe the poem as "a particularly distinguished performance" and drew comparisons to "Song of Myself".

Analysis 
"The Sleepers" received relatively little critical attention until the later 20th century, when several studies were published. Scholar R. S. Mishra notes that all the seemingly disparate events are in fact united by the night they are viewed in. The historian Alan Trachtenberg wrote that none of the original poems in Leaves of Grass had "so baffled and so intrigued readers" as "The Sleepers." The scholar Michael Rainer called it "perhaps the most startling and modern of the untitled poems" in the first edition of Leaves of Grass.

Analysis of the poem has included using the theories of Carl Jung, viewing the poem in the context of "uroboric incest", which Rainer describes as "the return of the conscious to a pre-conscious state".

Revisions 
Trachtenberg considers Whitman's revisions and retitlings of the poem to show a change in emphasis.

Slavery section 
In the poem, a large, strong black whale is used as a symbol that represents "the destructive power of American slaves in revolt against white society." An early version of the metaphor in Whitman's notebook read:

In the metaphor, the "sportsmen" are white people. The sixth section of the poem includes a segment that is written in first person from the point of view of a Black slave, described only as Lucifer's "heir", including the lines:

Lucifer may refer to several different things or people; in 1956, Sholom J. Kahn speculated he may have been a slave trader. Kahn also thinks it possible Lucifer is referencing Satan, or a broader concept of evil. Whitman may have been influenced in the passage by Philip James Bailey's Festus.  According to the scholar Christopher Beach, the images of Lucifer and a whale allow a slave to express themselves, though society denies them a voice. Beach calls the phrasing "Now Lucifer was not dead" "one of the most striking moments in all of Whitman's poetry." The section is Whitman's most clear condemnation of slavery and his most clear effort to understand the thoughts of an enslaved person. This passage was unprecedented among white American poets, but was cut in the 1881 Leaves of Grass, for unclear reasons. Whitman wrote no comparable poetry after 1855. Ed Folsom in 2000 called the passage "one of the most powerful and evocative passages about slavery in American literature".

References

Bibliography

Further reading 
 
 
 Clarke, Graham (1991). "'The Sleepers': Whit-man’s City of Dreadful Night." In Walt Whitman: The Poem as Private History. London: Vision, pp. 99–126.

External links 
 The Changing Shape of "The Sleepers," with special attention to the "Lucifer" passage

Poetry by Walt Whitman
1855 poems
Works about American slavery